Sayyid Muhammad Sa'id Al-Habboubi (1849-  1915) was an Iraqi Poet, Faqīh, and a merchant, born in Najaf to a wealthy family.

Life and career
He studied Faqih and Arabic language in Hawza of the Najaf.
Later, he worked in trade, due to his business he had to move often between Najaf and Najad. He described his travels and expatriation in his poems. Habboubi quit poetry when he reached forty, and spent rest of his life teaching Fiqh in Hawza of the Najaf.

At breakout of the World War I, Al-Habboubi led volunteer groups in the Ottoman Empire against British invading forces, but he died suddenly during the Siege of Kut in 1915.

He was buried in Imam Ali Mosque in Najaf city.

A sculpture was erected to Habboubi in the central square of Nasiriyah city.

Books
collection of poems (4 editions).

See also

 Iraqi art
 List of Iraqi artists
 Al-Habboubi Square

References

19th-century poets from the Ottoman Empire
People from Najaf
1849 births
1915 deaths
Iraqi Shia clerics
19th-century poets of Ottoman Iraq
Male poets from the Ottoman Empire
19th-century businesspeople from the Ottoman Empire
20th-century Iraqi poets
Pupils of Muhammad Kadhim Khorasani